The Washington Double Star Catalog, or WDS, is a catalog of double stars, maintained at the United States Naval Observatory. The catalog contains positions, magnitudes, proper motions and spectral types and has entries for (as of June 2017) 141,743 pairs of double stars. The catalog also includes multiple stars. In general, a multiple star with n components will be represented by entries in the catalog for n-1 pairs of stars.

History
The database used to construct the WDS originated at Lick Observatory, where it was used to construct the Index Catalog of Visual Double Stars, published in 1963. In 1965, under the initiative of Charles Worley, it was transferred to the Naval Observatory.

The catalog has since been augmented by many measurements, mainly from the Hipparcos and Tycho catalogues and results from speckle interferometry, as well as other sources. A unique 1–3 letter discovery code is used to identify the observer who reported the information. For example, HEI is used for the German astronomer W. D. Heintz.

See also
 Aitken Double Star Catalogue
 Burnham Double Star Catalogue

References

External links 
 The WDS at the US Naval Observatory
 The Washington Double Star Catalog at VizieR
 StelleDoppie interface to the WDS

Astronomical catalogues of stars
Double stars